No 1 (Royal Red and Blue) is a 1954 Color Field painting by the Abstract expressionist artist Mark Rothko. In November 2012, the painting sold for US$75.1 million (£47.2m) at a Sotheby's auction.

See also
 List of most expensive paintings

References

External links
Sotheby's presentation

1954 paintings
Paintings by Mark Rothko